The 1900 Washington gubernatorial election was held on November 6, 1900.

Incumbent Governor John Rankin Rogers won re-election as the Democratic nominee. He defeated Republican nominee John M. Frink with 48.86% of the vote.

In 1896, Rogers was the fusion candidate of the Democratic, Populist and Silver Republican parties. In 1900, he was nominated by a unity convention which merged the three parties in the state and took the name of the Democratic Party.

General election

Candidates
Major party candidates
John M. Frink, Republican, former State Senator
John Rankin Rogers, Democratic, incumbent Governor

Other candidates
Robert E. Dunlap, Prohibition, Prohibition nominee for Governor in 1896
William C.B. Randolph, Social Democrat, carpenter
William McCormick, Socialist Labor

Results

References

Bibliography
  
 

1900
Washington
Gubernatorial